Spain is one of only eight countries ever to have won the FIFA World Cup, doing so in South Africa in 2010, the first time the team had reached the final. 

The team is one of the most present at the World Cup, with 16 appearances out of the 22 tournaments. Prior to their win in 2010, Spain's best World Cup result was a fourth-place finish in 1950.

Spain have reached the semi-finals twice and the quarter-finals six times, but have not reached the last 8 since their triumph in 2010.

Records 

*Draws include knockout matches decided via penalty shoot-out

By match

By opponent

2010 World Cup

The Spanish team went to the 2010 World Cup in South Africa as European champions and enjoyed a record unbeaten streak of 35 matches from 2007 to 2009. Although they lost their first match 1–0 against Switzerland, they went on to win the group after victories over Honduras and Chile, while the Swiss failed to win another match and were eliminated.

The Spanish team won all three following knockout matches by a score of 1–0, always scoring in the second half of regular time. The opponents were Portugal, Paraguay and Germany.

2010 World Cup Final v the Netherlands

It was Spain's first and the Netherlands' third appearance in a World Cup final, but neither had ever won a trophy. Spain was the dominating side with 57% ball possession, but the Dutch opponents had several chances as well. In a rough match, referee Howard Webb showed fourteen yellow cards and sent off Dutch defender John Heitinga in the second half of extra time, after regular time ended goalless. However, even with the five yellow cards received in the final, the Spanish team was awarded the FIFA Fair Play Trophy after collecting only eight yellow cards in seven matches.

The winning goal was scored by Andrés Iniesta, a right foot strike from inside the box after an assist by Cesc Fàbregas.

Record players

Iker Casillas has captained Spain to their World Cup title in 2010 and won the Golden Glove award for best keeper at the same tournament.

Top goalscorers

No Spanish player has ever won the Golden Boot, but Emilio Butragueño and Spain's record World Cup scorer David Villa have each won the Silver Boot after scoring five goals in 1986 and 2010 respectively.

External links 
 RFEF site
 FIFA Official Ranking of all Participants at Finals 1930–2002. FIFA Match Results for all Stages 1930–2002
 FIFA official site

 
Countries at the FIFA World Cup
World Cup